The East Is Red (also known as Swordsman III; released in the Philippines as The Great China Warrior), is a 1993 Hong Kong wuxia film. The main character in the film is loosely based on Dongfang Bubai, a character in Louis Cha's novel The Smiling, Proud Wanderer. The film was produced by Tsui Hark, was co-directed by Ching Siu-tung and Raymond Lee and starred Brigitte Lin, Joey Wong and Yu Rongguang. The film is regarded as a sequel to The Swordsman and Swordsman II.

Plot
Following Dongfang Bubai's apparent death in Swordsman II, the jianghu (martial artists' community) disintegrates into chaos as it lacks a dominant figure to serve as a de facto leader. Several imposters use Dongfang Bubai's name to rally supporters, form their own schools, and fight for power. One of Dongfang Bubai's devoted lovers, Xue Qianxun, rebuilds the Sun Moon Holy Cult by impersonating Dongfang Bubai.

The Ming imperial court sends a naval admiral, Gu Changfeng, to assist the Spanish in searching for the remains of a Dutch warship sunk near Black Woods Cliff, the site of Dongfang Bubai's death in Swordsman II. At Black Woods Cliff, Gu Changfeng discovers that Dongfang Bubai is still alive in disguise as an elderly woman, and manages to convince him to return to the jianghu.

Dongfang Bubai unleashes his fury and starts a bloodbath in eliminating all those who impersonate him. He discovers that Xue Qianxun has been pretending to be him, and seriously injures her in anger. Consumed by his desire for power, Dongfang Bubai decides to continue his ambitious plan to unite the jianghu under his rule and dominate China.

Gu Changfeng realises that Dongfang Bubai has gone out of control so he leads the Ming imperial navy to fight Dongfang and his Spanish and Japanese allies. In the ensuing naval battle, all the warships are destroyed and Dongfang Bubai emerges victorious after defeating and killing Gu Changfeng. However, Xue Qianxun loses her life in the process. Dongfang Bubai realises his mistake and embraces his dead lover as he retires from the jianghu again.

Cast
 Brigitte Lin as Dongfang Bubai 
 Joey Wong as Xue Qianxun 
 Yu Rongguang as Gu Changfeng 
 Lau Shun
 Eddy Ko
 Jean Wang
 Lee Ka-ting
 Kingdom Yuen

Release
The East Is Red was released in Hong Kong on January 21, 1993. In the Philippines, the film was released as The Great China Warrior by World Films in April 1995.

Critical response
The film received a positive review from the Los Angeles Times.

References

External links
 
 

1993 films
1993 LGBT-related films
Films based on Chinese novels
Films based on works by Jin Yong
Films directed by Ching Siu-tung
Films set in the Ming dynasty
Hong Kong LGBT-related films
Transgender-related films
Works based on The Smiling, Proud Wanderer
Wuxia films
1990s Hong Kong films